Monofora is a type of the single-light window, usually narrow, crowned by an arch, and decorated by small columns or pilasters.

Overview
The term usually refers to a certain type of window designed during the Romanesque, Gothic, and Renaissance periods, and also during the nineteenth-century Eclecticism in architecture. In other cases, the term may mean an arched window with a single opening.

Gallery

See also
Lancet window
Bifora
Trifora
Quadrifora
Polifora

References

 

Architectural elements
Windows